Igor Dovgyallo (born 17 July 1985) is a Belarusian footballer who plays for Naftan Novopolotsk.

Honours
Naftan Novopolotsk
Belarusian Cup winner: 2011–12

External links
 
 
 Profile at Naftan website

1985 births
Living people
Sportspeople from Vitebsk
Belarusian footballers
Association football goalkeepers
FC Polotsk players
FC Vitebsk players
FC Smorgon players
FC Naftan Novopolotsk players
FC Dnepr Mogilev players
FC Gorodeya players